Sir Richard Joseph Sullivan, 1st Baronet (10 December 1752 – 17 July 1806) was a British MP and writer.

Biography
He was the third son of Benjamin Sullivan of Dromeragh, Co. Cork, by his wife Bridget, daughter of Paul Limrick, D.D.

With the help of Laurence Sullivan, chairman of the East India Company, he was sent early in life to India with his brother John. On his return to Europe, he made a tour through various parts of England, Scotland and Wales. He was elected a Fellow of the Society of Antiquaries on 9 June 1785 and a Fellow of the Royal Society on 22 December 1785.

On 29 January 1787, Sullivan was elected MP for New Romney and returned for the same constituency at the general election on 19 June 1790. He lost his seat in 1796, but on 5 July 1802 was elected for Seaford, another of the Cinque ports. Although often voting in the House of Commons, there is no record of him having made a speech there. On 22 May 1804, on Pitt's return to office, he was created a baronet of the United Kingdom. 

He wrote a number of books on political issues.  

Sullivan died at his home in Thames Ditton, Surrey, on 17 July 1806, and is commemorated by a memorial plaque in the Church of St Nicholas, Thames Ditton.

Family

He had married, on 3 December 1778, Mary, daughter of Thomas Lodge of Leeds. 
Their eldest son died young in 1789, and the title devolved to the second son, Henry (1785–1814), MP for the city of Lincoln. 
The latter was succeeded as third baronet by his brother, Sir Charles Sullivan (1789–1862), who entered the navy in February 1801 and became Admiral of the Blue.

Richard (d. 1789)
Maria (3 Nov – 28 Dec 1786)
Lt. Col. Sir Henry (13 Mar 1785 – 14 Apr 1814); served as an officer in the Coldstream Guards, and was killed at the Battle of Bayonne in 1814. Unmarried.
Charlotte (4 Nov 1787 – 28 Mar 1873); married William Hale, son of the Hon. Mary Grimston (daughter of James Grimston, 2nd Viscount Grimston) and great-grandson of Sir Bernard Hale. They had a son and daughter.
Adm. Sir Charles (28 Feb 1789 – 21 Nov 1862); married Jean Anne Taylor and had five known children, including Sir Charles and Sir Edward.
Elizabeth (14 Apr 1790 – 2 Jul 1846)
Edward Richard (8 Jun 1791 – 6 Oct 1824); married Eliza Maria Caldwell, daughter of Gen. Sir James Lillyman Caldwell GCB. They had two sons, and a daughter, Maria Charlotte, later wife of Sir John Lees, 3rd Baronet.
Thomas (d. 5 Mar 1796)
Rev. Frederick (1 Feb 1797 – 28 Jul 1873); married Arabella Jane Wilmot (d. 27 Jan 1839), granddaughter of Sir Chaloner Ogle, 1st Baronet. Four years after Arabella's death, he married Emily Ames, but no issue. With Arabella, he had two sons and a daughter, including Sir Francis Sullivan, 6th Baronet.
Maj. Arthur (28 Jul 1801 – 7 Jun 1832); unmarried.
Maj.-Gen. William (10 Oct 1804 – 6 Jan 1870); married Euphemia Caulfield Harrington. No known issue.

Bibliography
 ‘An Analysis of the Political History of India. In which is considered the present situation of the East, and the connection of its several Powers with the Empire of Great Britain’ (anon.), London, 1779, 4to; 2nd edit., with the author's name, 1784, 8vo; translated into German by M. C. Sprengel, Halle, 1787, 8vo.
 ‘Thoughts on Martial Law, and on the proceedings of general Courts-Martial’ (anon.), London, 1779, 4to; 2nd edit. enlarged, with the author's name, London, 1784, 8vo.
 ‘Observations made during a Tour through parts of England, Scotland, and Wales, in a series of Letters’ (anon.), London, 1780, 4to; 2nd edit., 2 vols., London, 1785, 8vo; reprinted in Mavor's 'British Tourists.'
 ‘Philosophical Rhapsodies: Fragments of Akbur of Betlis; containing Reflections on the Laws, Manners, Customs, and Religions of Certain Asiatic, Afric, and European Nations,’ 3 vols., London, 1784–5, 8vo.
 ‘Thoughts on the Early Ages of the Irish Nation and History, and on the Ancient Establishment of the Milesian Families in that Kingdom; with a particular reference to the descendants of Heber, the eldest son of Milesius,’ 1789, 8vo. Of this curious work, two editions of one hundred copies each were privately printed.
 ‘A View of Nature, in Letters to a Traveller among the Alps, with Reflections on Atheistical Philosophy now exemplified in France’ 6 vols., London, 1794, 8vo; translated into German by E. B. G. Hebenstreit, 4 vols., Leipzig, 1795–1800, 8vo.

References

Attribution:

External links
 
 

1752 births
1806 deaths
18th-century Irish people
19th-century Irish people
Politicians from County Cork
Irish writers
Baronets in the Baronetage of the United Kingdom
Members of the Parliament of Great Britain for English constituencies
British MPs 1784–1790
Fellows of the Royal Society
British MPs 1790–1796
Members of the Parliament of the United Kingdom for English constituencies
UK MPs 1802–1806